The Society of Scottish Artists is a Scottish artist-run organization which seeks to promote and encourage experimentation and the "adventurous spirit" in Scottish art.

It was founded in 1891 and its main space for annual exhibitions has been the Royal Scottish Academy Building on Princes Street in Edinburgh. The first President was Robert Noble.

The Society's exhibition policy has long been outward-looking. In 1931 it provided a first UK exhibition for works by Edvard Munch, who became a member of the Society.

In recent years the Society has organized exchange visits and exhibitions with artists in Japan and the United States.

The Society is one of the constituent organizations of ESSA.

See also
 Visual Arts Scotland

References

External links
 SSA Website

19th-century art groups
Scottish art
1891 establishments in Scotland
Organisations based in Edinburgh
Arts organisations based in Scotland
Scottish artist groups and collectives
Scottish contemporary art